James Percy Priest (April 1, 1900 – October 12, 1956) was an American teacher, journalist and politician who represented Tennessee in the United States House of Representatives from 1941 until his death.

Background 
Priest was born in Carters Creek, Maury County, Tennessee, the son of George and Harriet (née Hastings) Priest. He attended Central High School in Columbia, and afterward continued his education at State Teachers' College in Murfreesboro (now Middle Tennessee State University), Peabody College in Nashville, and the University of Tennessee. He taught school in Culleoka, in his native Maury County, from 1920 until 1926, when he joined the editorial staff of the Nashville Tennessean. In 1937, he began courting Mildred Webster Noland, whom he would marry in 1947. They had one daughter, Harriet.

Congress 
In 1940, Priest was encouraged to run for the United States House of Representatives as an independent in Tennessee's 5th congressional district, which is based in Nashville. He won in an upset, defeating the incumbent, one-term Democratic Congressman Jo Byrns, Jr.  Upon swearing-in, he immediately joined the Democratic caucus, and was reelected seven times. The district was renumbered the 6th District in 1943 and became the 5th once again in 1953. He served as the House majority whip between 1949 and 1953. Priest was one of three Democrats in the Tennessee House delegation who did not sign the 1956 Southern Manifesto, the others being Joe Evins and Ross Bass.

At the time of his death, Priest was serving as the chairman of the House Commerce Committee and had already secured the Democratic nomination for a ninth term, which had essentially assured him of reelection since no Republican has been elected to the U.S. House of Representatives from Nashville since Reconstruction.

Death and legacy 
In early October 1956, Priest entered a Nashville hospital for an operation on an ulcer and was reported in satisfactory condition. However, complications developed and he died in the early morning hours of October 12.

Priest was interred at Woodlawn Cemetery in Nashville. J. Percy Priest Dam, a United States Army Corps of Engineers hydroelectric and flood control structure just east of Nashville on the Stones River (and easily visible from Interstate 40) is named in his honor, as is Percy Priest Lake (created by the dam) and an elementary school in Forest Hills, a suburb of Nashville.

In August 2010, it was announced that Priest's papers, along with the research files of Rebecca Stubbs, author of the biography J. Percy Priest and His Amazing Race, had been donated to the Tennessee State Library and Archives.

See also
 List of United States Congress members who died in office (1950–99)

References

1900 births
1956 deaths
American newspaper reporters and correspondents
Schoolteachers from Tennessee
Middle Tennessee State University alumni
People from Nashville, Tennessee
Journalists from Tennessee
Tennessee Independents
Independent Democrat members of the United States House of Representatives
Democratic Party members of the United States House of Representatives from Tennessee
20th-century American non-fiction writers
Deaths from ulcers
20th-century American politicians
20th-century American educators
20th-century American journalists
American male journalists
20th-century American male writers